BreconRidge was a contract manufacturer of electronics, particularly telecommunications systems, based in Ottawa, Ontario, Canada. It acquired Ridgeway Research Corporation, the manufacturing division of Mitel Networks and 4test.

The name BreconRidge was based on the practice of founder Terry Matthews to name companies after geographic entities, especially those connected to his childhood home in the Marches area on the border of Wales and England. BreconRidge was derived from the Brecon Beacons range of mountains in Wales, and from the seed company Ridgeway Research Corporation.

The company was purchased by Sanmina-SCI in May 2010. Sanmina-SCI closed the only US BreconRidge facility in Ogdensburg, NY, and moved its telecommunication repair operation to Guadalajara, Mexico.

Electronics companies of Canada
Companies based in Ottawa